The China Ethnic Museum (中华民族博物馆; pinyin: Zhōnghuá Mínzú Bówùguǎn; also called Chinese Ethnic Culture Park, 中华民族园; pinyin: Zhōnghuá Mínzú Yuán) is a museum in Beijing, China, located just to the west of the Olympic Green. It features displays of the daily life and architecture of China's 56 ethnic groups.

As stated on its website, the museum's goals are as follows:

To demonstrate ethnic architecture
To preserve ethnic relics
To spread ethnic knowledge
To study ethnic heritage
To enhance ethnic culture
To promote unity of all Chinese ethnic groups

Construction began in October 1992. The North Section was opened to the public on June 18, 1994, and the South Section was opened in September 2001. Construction has continued through the 2008 Summer Olympics. The museum covers approximately 50 hectares and so far comprises 44 ethnic villages and 200 ethnic buildings. There are 800 staff members comprising various Chinese ethnic groups. All buildings are constructed to a ratio of 1:1.

At the museum, several ethnic groups grow traditional crops such as paddy rice or buckwheat, and each day Tibetan lamas from the Tar Monastery of Qinghai chant Buddhist sutras.

The museum has also collected approximately 100,000 cultural relics, and exhibits items representing the daily life of China's ethnic groups.

The museum's curator is Wang Ping.

Ethnic activities
Festivals and cultural activities featured by the China Ethnic Museum include the following:

Tibetan Shoton Festival
Tibetan New Year
The New-rice Festival of the Va
The Sowing Festival of the Va
The Sanduo Festival of the Naxi
The Munao Singing Festival of the Jingpo
The Water-splashing Festival of the Dai
The Third of March Festival of the Bai
The Huaer Fair of the Tu
The Nandun Festival of the Tu
The Sheba Festival of Tujia
The Chahua Festival of the Yi
The Knife-shaft Festival of Miao
The Dragon-boat Festival of the Miao
The Horse Milk Festival
The Pepper Festival of the Salar
Raoshanlin Singing Festival of the Bai
The Fashion Show of the Yi

See also
China Folk Culture Village
Vietnam Museum of Ethnology

External links
China Ethnic Museum official site
Gallery

Museums in Beijing
Culture in Beijing
 
Ethnographic museums in Asia